The Ambassador of Australia to Peru is an officer of the Australian Department of Foreign Affairs and Trade and the head of the Embassy of the Commonwealth of Australia to the Republic of Peru. The position has the rank and status of an Ambassador Extraordinary and Plenipotentiary and holds non-resident accreditation for Bolivia (since 2010). Prior to accreditation with Bolivia being transferred to the embassy in Lima, accreditation has been held variously by Ambassadors to Chile, Argentina and Brazil. The current ambassador, since March 2022, is Maree Ringland.

The Australian Government first announced it would open an embassy in Lima in 1968. The Australian Embassy in Peru was closed between 1986 and 2010, as a result of the 1986 Australian Government Budget.

List of heads of mission

Notes
 Also non-resident Australian Ambassador to the Republic of Colombia, 1976 to 1983.
 Also non-resident Australian Ambassador to the Plurinational State of Bolivia, since 2010.

References

Australia
 

Peru
Australia